My Body, My Child is a 1982 American made-for-television drama film directed by Marvin J. Chomsky and starring Vanessa Redgrave. It premiered on ABC on 12 April 1982. It includes early performances by future Sex and the City co-stars, Sarah Jessica Parker and Cynthia Nixon. It is also the final television role of Jack Albertson, who was subsequently nominated posthumously for the Primetime Emmy Award for Outstanding Supporting Actor in a Miniseries or a Movie.

Plot
Leenie (Redgrave) is a middle-aged Irish-American schoolteacher with three grown daughters. Yet she unexpectedly finds herself pregnant again and is delighted. However her doctor rejects this possibility because of an unreliable blood test and her age. Thus her symptoms such as troubled sleeping and sickness are mis-diagnosed as psychogenic. She is prescribed a host of medications to cope with these difficulties. However it later turns out that she is in fact pregnant and that these medications have been causing irreversible damage to her unborn baby. Faced with the truth that her child will be born with defects, she faces a decision to keep the baby or go against her religious beliefs and have an abortion.

Cast
Vanessa Redgrave as Leenie Cabrezi
Jack Albertson as Poppa MacMahon
Joseph Campanella as Joe Cabrezi
Stephen Elliott as Dr. Gallagher
James Naughton as Dr. Dan Berensen
Gail Strickland as Adele
Maia Danziger as Barbara 'Bo'
Kenneth Kimmins as Bill
Stephen D. Newman as Dr. Fialkin
Sarah Jessica Parker as Katy
Cynthia Nixon as Nancy
Alexandra Borrie as Jana
Leon B. Stevens as Dr. Butler
Charles Kahlenberg as Dr. Spoke
Mavis Ray as Aunt Beasey

See also
Catholicism and abortion

References

External links

1982 television films
1982 films
1982 drama films
1980s English-language films
ABC network original films
Films about abortion
Films directed by Marvin J. Chomsky
American drama television films
1980s American films